Stellar is an American pop singer, songwriter, and producer from Lowell, Massachusetts, based in Los Angeles. His career launched on August 6th, 2019 with the release of his debut mixtape "Bipolar." In 2020, Stellar released the single "Ashes," which achieved Gold RIAA certification and helped him sign a record deal with Arista Records.

Discography

Mixtapes

Singles

References

External links 
 

Year of birth missing (living people)
Living people